Mirza Abbas Uddin Ahmed, known as Mirza Abbas, (born 7 February 1951) is a Bangladesh Nationalist Party politician and a member of the national standing committee of the party. He was the Mayor of Dhaka City Corporation from 1991 to 1993. He was the Member of Parliament (MP) for Dhaka-6 from 2001 to 2006, and Minister of Housing and Public Works in Khaleda's cabinet.

Early life and career

Abbas was born on 7 February 1951 in Kishoreganj, East Bengal to businessman Abdur Razzak and Kamla Khatun. He had his schooling in the local educational institutions in Kishoreganj. Later, he got admitted to the University of Dhaka in 1966 and earned his Bachelor of Commerce degree in 1972.

After obtaining his bachelor's, Abbas joined his family business, Mirza Enterprises. He is the founder of Dhaka Bank Limited. He was officially introduced to the board of the bank as an alternate director in November 1995. He was appointed director of the bank on 29 March 2012.

Political career

Abbas is among those leaders who started their political career with the emergence of Bangladesh Nationalist Party and worked with President Ziaur Rahman.

Abbas was appointed as the mayor of Dhaka City Corporation in 1991. He served at that position until December 1993. Later, in the election of 2001, Mirza Abbas was elected as a member of parliament from capital Dhaka. He was appointed as the Minister of Housing and Public Works. Mirza Abbas, as a minister, time and again focused on the strict enforcement of Wetland Protection Act to ensure environmental balance and flooding. The Ministry of Housing and Public Works under his able leadership amended the Building Construction Rules that was finally enacted in December 2006.

Under his auspices, the Ministry also formulated Private Housing Land Development Rules, a guideline to streamline real estate developers particularly involved in filling up thousands of acres of wetland and flood flow zones. In The 5th National Council of Bangladesh Nationalist Party of 2009, he was selected as a national standing committee member of the party for his contribution towards the party. He was later given the responsibility of the convener of party's Dhaka city unit in 2014. In 2015, he collected his nomination form to contest as a mayoral candidate from Dhaka South City Corporation.

Charges and convictions
On 25 February 2007, Abbas was arrested when he went to submit his wealth statement to the Anti-Corruption Commission (ACC). He was among the first list of 50 graft suspects.

On 15 July 2007, ACC filed a case against Abbas, former BNP MP Ali Asgar Lobi and Mahfuzul Islam, a government official. The case accused them of illegally allotting an industrial plot in Tejgaon Industrial Area for Pacific Chemicals Ltd, a company owned by Lobi in 2006.

On 12 May 2008, Abbas was sentenced to 8 years' imprisonment on charges of invading tax upon his income for during 1990–2007 and also, furnishing false information in the tax returns.

On 6 March 2014, ACC filed a graft cast against Abbas over corruption in plot allocation among journalists when he was the housing and public works minister.  After a Supreme Court ruling, he was released on bail from jail in April 2016.

On 6 January 2016, after the surrender, Abbas was jailed in connection with two violence cases. The cases were filed in December 2014 and January 2015.

Personal life
Abbas is married to Afroza Abbas, the president of Jatiyatabadi Mahila Dal, a wing of the BNP.

Social service
Abbas established the Mirza Abbas Mohila Degree College for the betterment of women education in his locality. He donated to SEID Trust, a school for autistic children.

References

1951 births
Living people
People from Kishoreganj District
University of Dhaka alumni
Bangladesh Nationalist Party politicians
5th Jatiya Sangsad members
6th Jatiya Sangsad members
8th Jatiya Sangsad members
Housing and Public Works ministers of Bangladesh